Arturo Cardelús (born 1981) is a Spanish-American composer of film and concert music. He is best known for his score for the animated feature Buñuel in the Labyrinth of the Turtles, which was nominated for a Goya Award.

Biography 
Cardelús was born in Madrid, Spain on December 27, 1981. He became an American citizen in 2019. He studied at the Conservatorio Superior de Música (Salamanca, Spain), Royal Academy of Music, Franz Liszt Academy of Music, and Berklee College of Music.

In 2012, Cardelús orchestrated the score for the film The Paperboy. In 2015, he composed the soundtrack for the Italian film Chiamatemi Francesco. In 2017, Cardelús composed the soundtrack for the animated short In a Heartbeat, which went viral and attracted wide attention. The score won Best Original Score – Animated Short Film at the Hollywood Music in Media Awards. Cardelús's song "Song for the Untitled" from the 2018 documentary Yo Galgo, which Cardelús also scored, was nominated for Best Original Song – Documentary in the following year's Hollywood Music in Media Awards.

In 2019, Cardelús scored the animated feature Buñuel in the Labyrinth of the Turtles. His music for the film won awards for best score at the 2019 Annecy International Animation Film Festival and the 2019 Málaga Film Festival. The score was also nominated for a Goya Award, a Feroz Award, and a Spanish Cinema Writers Circle Award for best original score and for a Hollywood Music in Media Award and an International Film Music Critics Association Award for best original score in an animated film.

In classical music, Cardelús attracted national attention for his 2013 composition Con Aire de Tango, which was commissioned by members of the Berlin Philharmonic after they saw a video of his work on YouTube. Two years later, Naxos Records released an album of Cardelús' compositions. In 2016, Cardelús was elected Associate of the Royal Academy of Music (ARAM). His work Grace was nominated for a 2017 Hollywood Music in Media Award in the category Contemporary Classical/Instrumental. Works by Cardelús have been performed in venues including Madrid's National Auditorium and Boston's Jordan Hall.

Cardelús lives and works in Los Angeles.

Arturo’s 2016 piece, “Grace,” was in the repertoire for “The Edge of Eternity,” a show performed by the Pride of Broken Arrow in 2021. The Oklahoma-based marching band, performing said show, would win the Bands of America Grand-National Championships in November with a record-breaking score of 98.250 out of 100.

Filmography 
The Paperboy (orchestrator) (2012)
Tangernación (2013)
War Is Beautiful (2014)
The Answers (2015) (short)
Chiamatemi Francesco (2015)
In a Heartbeat (2017) (short)
Altamira, el origen del arte (2018)
Yo Galgo (2018)
Original Sin (2018)
The People's Fighters (2018)
On the Run (2018)
Buñuel in the Labyrinth of the Turtles (2019)
Aún se bendicen los campos (2019)
Kalipay (2019)
Black Beach (2020)
 Edge of Eternity(2021)
Dylan & Zoey (post-production)
Centurion XII (post-production)
Back to Lyla (post-production)

Concert music discography 
 Con Aire de Tango (Naxos Records, 2015)
 “Edge of Eternity” (Pride of Broken Arrow, 2021)

Awards and nominations

References

External links 
 Official site
 

1981 births
Spanish composers
Spanish male composers
Spanish pianists
Living people
Musicians from Madrid
Franz Liszt Academy of Music alumni
Alumni of the Royal Academy of Music
Berklee College of Music alumni